Gao Yunfei (born 24 July 1992) is a Chinese footballer who plays for China League Two side Lhasa Urban Construction Investment.

Club career 
Gao joined China League Two club Hebei Zhongji from Tianjin Teda youth team in 2012. On 26 May 2012, he scored his first and second goal for Hebei in the 2012 Chinese FA Cup which ensured Hebei beat Tongji University 2–1. He played as a substitute player in the club, following Hebei to promote to China League One in 2014 and Chinese Super League in 2016. He made his Super League debut on 10 July 2016 in a 2–0 home defeat against Guangzhou R&F, coming on as a substitute for Dong Xuesheng in the 76th minute.

Career statistics 
.

References 

Living people
1992 births
Association football forwards
Chinese footballers
Footballers from Tianjin
Hebei F.C. players
Chinese Super League players
China League One players